Claude-Augustin [de] Tercier de Vaduens (8 November 1752, Philippeville - 24 February 1823) was a French Royalist general during the Chouannerie, heading the chouans in the la Charnie forest, commanding the Vaiges division.

1752 births
1823 deaths
People from Philippeville
French generals
Royalist insurgents during the French Revolution
French counter-revolutionaries
French military personnel of the American Revolutionary War